Balliol Road railway station was on the Alexandra Dock Branch, Bootle, Merseyside, England, it opened on 5 September 1881 and closed to passengers on 31 May 1948. Goods trains to and from Seaforth Dock still pass through the station site.

References

Sources

External links
 The station's history Disused Stations
 The station and local lines on multiple maps Rail Maps Online
 The station on a 25" Edwardian OS Map National Library of Scotland
 The station on line SCT2, with mileages Railway Codes

Disused railway stations in the Metropolitan Borough of Sefton
Former London and North Western Railway stations
Railway stations in Great Britain opened in 1881
Railway stations in Great Britain closed in 1948
Bootle
1881 establishments in England